Kuria is an atoll, formed by a pair of islets, in the Central Gilbert Islands in Kiribati, northwest of Aranuka.  The two islets, Buariki and Oneeke, are separated by a 20 metre wide channel on a shallow water platform (Te buriiti), which is crossed by a bridge of the connecting road. The islands are surrounded by fringing reef which is broadest on the eastern side of Kuria. The population of Kuria was 1,046 in 2015.

Geography 

Kuria is made up of two islets, which are reef islands as they do not have a lagoon. The main islet, Buariki, has five villages; Marenaua, Bouatoa, Buariki, Tabontebike and Norauea. These villages are connected to the smaller islet of Oneeke by a  bridge replacing the old causeway that ran across the former reef passage between the two islets. The two islets are relatively wide as compared to most islands in the Gilbert group. There are two natural brackish-water ponds at east-southern tip of the main islet.

The main administration center is located at Buariki, and the airport, police headquarters, guest house and Junior Secondary School are also located here.

Villages

History 

Kuria means 'almost seen on the horizon'.

The islands were surveyed in 1841 by the US Exploring Expedition.

In the 1840s, the islands of Kuria and Aranuka were conquered by Tenkoruti  or Karotu, the paramount chief  or the Uea (king) of Abemama, when a former ruler (Ten Temea) of Kuria and Aranuka gave up these two islands to King Karotu from Abemama and left for Maiana, another of the Gilbert group. In 1878  Tenkoruti's nephew, Tembinok' or Tem Binoka became the Uea.  He acquired firearms and manufactured goods from traders and he purchased a ship. To pay for his acquisitions he tightened his control over the 3 islands in order to increase his supply of coconuts and other produce, which he sold to the traders.  Tembinok' was immortalised by Robert Louis Stevenson's description of him in his book In the South Seas. Robert Louis Stevenson spent two months on Abemama in 1889. Stevenson described Tembinok' as the "one great personage in the Gilberts …  and the last tyrant". 
 
In early European times, animals in Kuria were not considered a welcome addition to the ecosystem. As a result, introduced animals were considered a subject of supernatural fears and were slaughtered and thrown into the lagoon.

Kuria Post Office opened around 1912.

Tourism 
Air Kiribati operates two flights per week from South Tarawa, linking with neighbouring Aranuka Airport.  Boat charters are also available.

The Island Council operates a guest house, where tourists are welcome, although it is advisable to be prepared as the island is very isolated.

Dress code is restricted on Kuria. Casual wear is preferable and women are not allowed to walk around with bikinis, mini skirts or shorts. A skirt/short covered down to your knees or wrapped around lava-lava and T-shirts are preferable.

Notes

References

Exhibit: The Alfred Agate Collection: The United States Exploring Expedition, 1838-1842 from the Navy Art Gallery

Gilbert Islands
Islands of Kiribati